James Wesley Harris is an American linguist and Emeritus Professor of Spanish & Linguistics at MIT.
He is known for his works on Spanish.

Books
 Syllable Structure and Stress in Spanish: A Nonlinear Analysis. Linguistic Inquiry Monograph 8, Cambridge: MIT Press 1983

References

MIT School of Humanities, Arts, and Social Sciences alumni
Linguists from the United States
Living people
American phonologists
MIT School of Humanities, Arts, and Social Sciences faculty
Year of birth missing (living people)
Linguists of Spanish